"Rhythm Divine" ("Ritmo Total" in Spanish countries) is a song by Spanish recording artist Enrique Iglesias, taken from his fourth studio album and debut English-language record Enrique (1999). It was released on 26 October 1999 by Interscope Records as the second single from the project. The song was written by Paul Barry and Mark Taylor, while production was handled by Taylor and Brian Rawling. An accompanying music video was directed by Francis Lawrence. The single topped the Spanish Singles Chart for eight weeks and reached the top 10 in Canada, the Czech Republic, Finland, Hungary, Italy, New Zealand, Norway, and Romania.

Critical reception
According to Billboard in the single review, Enrique Iglesias delivers this "savvy follow-up bid for top 40 longevity", this single is "precisely the kind of song that should ensure this crossover artist's chance to dance up the ladder of success". Also makes a comparison with fellow Latin performer Ricky Martin: "Unlike peer Ricky Martin, Iglesias is far from overexposed, leaving plenty of room for listeners to be surprised by his potential as a singer, performer, and presence to grow comfortable with on the top 40 airwaves". About the song structure: "Masterfully produced, passionately sung, and ready for the kind of video exploration that will further reveal this gorgeous young artist as one of the blossoming solo sex symbols of the new millennium, this song-written by "Bailamos" scribes Mark Taylor and Paul Barry-is a solid sell for fans of the new sound of the Latin nation, replete with Spanish guitars, a gutsy vocal, and rhythms that will move the masses in a single spin. Oh, so solid, "Rhythm Divine" will propel another new hero to the upper reaches of the charts in just a few short weeks. A sure sell-through from his upcoming English-language debut, the songs deserves a big bravo for sheer pop merit". The Daily Vault's Michael R. Smith called it a "bold" anthem, noting that it perhaps is one of "the most memorable cuts" of the album.

Chart performance
The track was not as successful as "Bailamos"; however, it reached number one in Spain for eight weeks and peaked within the top 10 in Finland, New Zealand and Norway, as well as the top 50 in many other European countries, North America and Australia. The Spanish version of the single, "Ritmo Total", hit the number-one spot on the US Billboard Hot Latin Tracks chart for four weeks. The single went platinum in Russia with 200,000 copies sold.

Music video
The video starts in a hotel, when a girl (Claudia Mason) gets out of a room and Enrique starts to follow her. He follows her across the whole city of Kuala Lumpur, until she gets to the beach and disappears in the sea with the shoes in her hand.

Track listings

European CD1
 "Rhythm Divine" – 3:29
 "Rhythm Divine" (Fernando G club mix) – 5:34

European CD2
 "Rhythm Divine" – 3:29
 "Rhythm Divine" (Morales radio mix) – 3:13
 "Rhythm Divine" – 3:29 (stereo dub mix) – 7:20
 "Rhythm Divine" (Lord G's Divine dub) – 6:46

UK CD1
 "Rhythm Divine" – 3:29
 "Bailamos" (Eric Morillo main vocal mix) – 6:30
 "Rhythm Divine" (CD-ROM video)

UK CD2
 "Rhythm Divine" (Morales radio mix) – 3:13
 "Rhythm Divine" (Fernando G club mix) – 5:34
 "Rhythm Divine" (Mijango's extended mix) – 6:57

UK cassette single
 "Rhythm Divine" – 3:29
 "Bailamos" (Eric Morillo main vocal mix) – 6:30

Australasian CD single
 "Rhythm Divine" (album version)
 "Rhythm Divine" (Fernando's English radio edit)
 "Rhythm Divine" (Morales club mix)
 "Rhythm Divine" (Fernando's English club mix)
 "Rhythm Divine" (Lord G's Divine dub)
 "Rhythm Divine" (Mijangos English extended mix)

Charts and certifications

Weekly charts

Year-end charts

Certifications

Release history

See also
 List of number-one singles of 1999 (Spain)
 List of number-one singles of 2000 (Spain)
 List of Romanian Top 100 number ones of the 2000s
 List of number-one Billboard Hot Latin Tracks of 1999
 List of number-one Billboard Hot Latin Tracks of 2000

References

1999 singles
1999 songs
Enrique Iglesias songs
Interscope Records singles
Macaronic songs
Music videos directed by Francis Lawrence
Number-one singles in the Czech Republic
Number-one singles in Romania
Number-one singles in Spain
Song recordings produced by Brian Rawling
Song recordings produced by Mark Taylor (record producer)
Songs written by Mark Taylor (record producer)
Songs written by Paul Barry (songwriter)
Spanish-language songs